The 149th Ohio Infantry Regiment, sometimes 149th Ohio Volunteer Infantry (or 149th OVI) was an infantry regiment in the Union Army during the American Civil War.

Service
The 149th Ohio Infantry was organized at Camp Dennison near Cincinnati, Ohio, and mustered in as an Ohio National Guard unit for 100 days service on May 8, 1864, under the command of Colonel Allison L. Brown.

The regiment was attached to Defenses of Baltimore, VIII Corps, Middle Department, to July 1864. 1st Separate Brigade, VIII Corps, to July 1864. Kenly's Independent Brigade, VIII Corps, to August 1864.

The 149th Ohio Infantry mustered out of service at Camp Dennison on August 30, 1864.

Detailed service
Left Ohio for Baltimore, Md., May 11.  Duty in the Defenses of Baltimore, and at different points on the eastern shore of Maryland until July 4. Moved to Monocacy Junction July 4. Battle of Monocacy Junction July 9. Moved to Washington, D.C., July 13. Advance to Snicker's Gap, Va., July 13–20. Operations in the Shenandoah Valley July 20-August 23. Action with Mosby at Berryville August 13.

Casualties
The regiment lost a total of 42 men during service; 4 enlisted men killed or mortally wounded, 38 enlisted men died of disease.

Commanders
 Colonel Allison L. Brown

See also

 List of Ohio Civil War units
 Ohio in the Civil War

References
 Dyer, Frederick H. A Compendium of the War of the Rebellion (Des Moines, IA:  Dyer Pub. Co.), 1908.
 Ohio Roster Commission. Official Roster of the Soldiers of the State of Ohio in the War on the Rebellion, 1861–1865, Compiled Under the Direction of the Roster Commission Akron, OH: Werner Co.), 1886–1895.
 Perkins, George. A Summer in Maryland and Virginia; Or, Campaigning with the 149th Ohio Volunteer Infantry, a Sketch of Events Connected with the Service of the Regiment in Maryland and the Shenandoah Valley, Virginia (Chillicothe, OH:  The Sholl Printing Company), 1911.
 Reid, Whitelaw. Ohio in the War: Her Statesmen, Her Generals, and Soldiers (Cincinnati, OH: Moore, Wilstach, & Baldwin), 1868. 
Attribution

External links
 Ohio in the Civil War: 149th Ohio Volunteer Infantry by Larry Stevens
 National flag of the 149th Ohio Infantry
 Regimental flag of the 149th Ohio Infantry

Military units and formations established in 1864
Military units and formations disestablished in 1864
1864 disestablishments in Ohio
Units and formations of the Union Army from Ohio
1864 establishments in Ohio